The Jacksonville State Gamecocks are  the intercollegiate athletic teams of  Jacksonville State University (JSU) located in Jacksonville, Alabama, United States. The Gamecocks athletic program is a member of the ASUN Conference, which it rejoined on July 1, 2021 after an 18-year absence spent in the Ohio Valley Conference, and competes at the NCAA Division I level including the Football Championship Subdivision. In football, JSU is currently a de facto associate member of the Western Athletic Conference (WAC), competing in a formal partnership between the ASUN and WAC that will operate until they formally join a FBS football league, Conference USA, in all sports for the 2023-24 academic year. 

The JSU mascot is Cocky the Gamecock, and the school colors are red and white. Gamecock teams have won six NCAA national championships in four sports, and, along with Wisconsin–Whitewater, is one of only two schools to win NCAA titles in baseball, basketball, and football.

Sports sponsored

Jacksonville State athletics began with the 1903 State Normal School (SNS) football team and was the domain of men only until women's sports were added in 1982. The SNS teams were known as the Eagle Owls, and the school colors were blue and gold. In 1946, the school's name was changed to Jacksonville Teachers College, and the team name and colors were also changed to the current Gamecocks and red and white.

A member of the ASUN Conference, Jacksonville State University sponsors  teams in six men's, ten women's, and one co-ed NCAA sanctioned sports:

NCAA national championships
The school has won the following NCAA championships.
1984 Division II Women's Gymnastics
1985 Division II Men's Basketball
1985 Division II Women's Gymnastics
1990 Division II Baseball
1991 Division II Baseball
1992 Division II Football

References

External links